Ryazan is a city in Russia.

It may also refer to:

Places 
Ryazan Oblast, a federal subject of Russia
Principality of Ryazan (1078–1521), Russian principality
Ryazan Governorate (1796–1929), an administrative division of the Russian Empire and the early Russian SFSR
Ryazan Urban Okrug, a municipal formation which the city of oblast significance of Ryazan in Ryazan Oblast, Russia is incorporated as
Ryazan (inhabited locality), several inhabited localities in Russia

Other 
FC Ryazan, an association football club based in Ryazan, Russia
HC Ryazan, an ice hockey club based in Ryazan, Russia
Ryazan VDV, a women's association football club based in Ryazan, Russia
 - a number of steamships with the name

See also 
 Ryazansky (disambiguation)